Vesicularia may refer to:
 Vesicularia (plant), a moss genus in the family Hypnaceae
 Vesicularia (bryozoan), a bryozoa genus in the family Vesiculariidae